Louis S. Goebel (July 9, 1839 in New York City – November 2, 1915 in Manhattan, NYC) was an American lawyer and politician from New York.

Life
He graduated from City College of New York in 1864. Then he taught school, studied law at Columbia Law School, was admitted to the bar in 1868, and practiced in New York City.

He was a member of the New York State Senate (6th D.) in 1878 and 1879.

He died at his home at 338 West 87th Street in Manhattan, and was buried at the Kensico Cemetery.

Sources
 Civil List and Constitutional History of the Colony and State of New York compiled by Edgar Albert Werner (1884; pg. 290)
 The State Government for 1879 by Charles G. Shanks (Weed, Parsons & Co, Albany NY, 1879; pg. 51)
 Lewis (sic) S. Goebel in NYT on November 4, 1915

1839 births
1915 deaths
Republican Party New York (state) state senators
Politicians from New York City
City College of New York alumni
Columbia Law School alumni
Burials at Kensico Cemetery
19th-century American politicians
Lawyers from New York City
19th-century American lawyers